Walter Kannemann (born 14 March 1991) is an Argentine footballer who plays as a central defender for Brazilian club Grêmio.

Career

San Lorenzo

Atlas

Grêmio
On 15 July 2016 Grêmio officially announced the signing of Walter Kannemann from Atlas for a €905.000 fee with a three and a half year contract until 31 December 2019.

International career
Kannemann made his international debut for Argentina on 8 September 2018 in a 3-0 international friendly against the Guatemala national football team.

Career statistics

Club

International

Honours

Club
San Lorenzo
Copa Libertadores: 2014
Argentine Primera División: 2013 Inicial

Grêmio
Copa Libertadores: 2017
Recopa Sudamericana: 2018
Copa do Brasil: 2016
Campeonato Gaúcho: 2018, 2019, 2020, 2021, 2022
Recopa Gaúcha: 2019, 2021, 2022

National
Superclásico de las Américas: 2019

References

External links
 
 
 
 

1991 births
Living people
Sportspeople from Entre Ríos Province
Argentine footballers
Argentina international footballers
Association football central defenders
Argentine Primera División players
San Lorenzo de Almagro footballers
Liga MX players
Atlas F.C. footballers
Campeonato Brasileiro Série A players
Grêmio Foot-Ball Porto Alegrense players
Copa Libertadores-winning players
Argentine expatriate footballers
Argentine expatriate sportspeople in Mexico
Argentine expatriate sportspeople in Brazil
Expatriate footballers in Mexico
Expatriate footballers in Brazil
Argentine people of German descent